Gotur is a village in Belagavi district in the northern state of Karnataka, India.

References

Villages in Belagavi district